Codeinone is 1/3 as active as codeine as an analgesic but it is an important intermediate in the production of hydrocodone, a painkiller about 3/4 the potency of morphine; as well as of oxycodone. The latter can also be synthesized from thebaine, however.

Chemical structure
Codeinone can be described as the methylether of morphinone: 3-methyl-morphinone.

Codeinone can be also described as the ketone of codeine: codeine-6-one.

Apoptotic activity 
Through renewed interest into possible anti-tumor activities of some of the opium alkaloids and derivatives, unrelated to their antinociceptive properties and habit-forming effects, the oxidation product of codeine has been found to induce cell death in three different human cancer cell lines in vitro.

References

Catechol ethers
Enones
4,5-Epoxymorphinans
Mu-opioid receptor agonists
Semisynthetic opioids